Kokora Glacier is the 13 km long and 1.5 km wide glacier in Stevrek Ridge, Aristotle Mountains on Oscar II Coast in Graham Land.  It flows 11 km eastwards between two parallel branches of the ridge, then turns southeast to join Melville Glacier.  Named after the settlement of Kokora in Southern Bulgaria.

Location
British mapping in 1976.

Maps
 British Antarctic Territory.  Scale 1:200000 topographic map.  DOS 610 Series, Sheet W 65 62.  Directorate of Overseas Surveys, Tolworth, UK, 1976.
 Antarctic Digital Database (ADD). Scale 1:250000 topographic map of Antarctica. Scientific Committee on Antarctic Research (SCAR). Since 1993, regularly upgraded and updated.

References
 Kokora Glacier. SCAR Composite Antarctic Gazetteer.
 Bulgarian Antarctic Gazetteer. Antarctic Place-names Commission. (details in Bulgarian, basic data in English)

External links
 Kokora Glacier. Copernix satellite image

Glaciers of Oscar II Coast
Bulgaria and the Antarctic